Bhagirathi Nepak (1 April 1931 – 3 January 2007) was an eminent scholar on  Mahima Dharma and Bhima Bhoi, and well known Odisha Sahitya Akademi award-winning writer.

He was born to Late Sadananda Nepak and Late Shreemati Devi at Binika of Sonepur District. But later his family moved to Lachhipur village of Subarnapur district. After finishing his graduation in Philosophy from  Gangadhar Meher College, Sambalpur, he joined as an auditor in the Government of Odisha.

He started writing with the "Kau O Koili" during his school days. Later he penned many books including Research books, Novels, Short Stories, Poetry etc. Till date more than 229 of his creations are published which include 34 novels, 3 collections of poems, many biographies, children literature, short plays. He is remembered for popularizing Satya Mahima Dharma.

Some of his creations are :
 Odisha ra Adibasi (The tribals of Odisha)
 Bhima Bhoi O Anyanya Prasanga (Bhima Bhoi and other)
 Punarabrutti - (Repeatation) a Novel
 Suchana - (Information/Notice) a Novel
 Patel Badhu Jaikadhi - a Novel
 Kali, Aji, Paradina - (Yesterday, Today and Tomorrow) - a Novel
 June Teyis Sujata ra Swapna - (The 23rd June) - A Novel
 Sujata ra Swapna - (The dreams of Sujata) - A novel
 Katha Bichitra - A bucket of short stories
 Chira Sabuja Galpa - (Evergreen stories) - Short Stories
 Chira Nutana Galpa - (Ever new  Stories) - Short Stories

References

1931 births
2007 deaths
People from Subarnapur district